Echo: Secrets of the Lost Cavern (known in Europe as Secret of the Lost Cavern) is a computer adventure game released in July 2005. It was developed by Kheops Studio and published by The Adventure Company. It is very similar to previous Kheops Studio games; the interface and gameplay are almost identical to Return to Mysterious Island. The player takes the role of Arok, a 15-year-old European Homo sapiens from the Paleolithic period.

Gameplay

Plot 
Secret of the Lost Cavern is set in the Paleolithic period around 15,000 B.C. The game follows Arok, a young hunter who discovers a cavern marked with a strange symbol. It reminds him of a charismatic traveler, Klem, who ventured through the lands of his clan a few years before. Klem is a painter and sorcerer with the gift of speaking with the spirits of the world through the paintings he creates on cave walls. Arok spent many days with this shaman artist, fascinated by his creations and his stories. After noticing the painter's talent in the cavern, Arok decides not to return to his clan, but rather follow the path of his mentor.

Development

Reception 
According to review aggregation site Metacritic, critical reception of Echo was "mixed or average".

Mark Smith of Game Chronicles thought the game offered a breath of fresh air in a category of boring and badly designed adventure games. Adventure-Treff reviewer Hans Frank wrote that the game offered an exciting and interesting journey into the past. Bodo Naser of 4Players noted that generic puzzles had been included to artificially lengthen the game's play time. Slydos of Adventure-Archiv thought the game followed in the tradition of Kheops Studio and Cryo Interactive. Jeuxvideo reviewer Superpanda positively compared the game to Myst, which he thought was too obscure to allow players to easily progress.

Charles Herold of The New York Times called Echo "painfully sincere" and found that its "story is a perfunctory vehicle for puzzles and a little anthropological teaching."

References

External links 
 Official website (archived)
 Echo: Secrets of the Lost Cavern at The Adventure Company (archived)
 Secret of the Lost Cavern (Mac) at Coladia Games (archived)
 Secret of the Lost Cavern (iOS) at Coladia Games (archived)
 Echo: Secrets of the Lost Cavern at MobyGames

2005 video games
Adventure games
First-person adventure games
iOS games
Kheops Studio games
MacOS games
Prehistoric people in popular culture
Single-player video games
The Adventure Company games
Video games developed in France
Video games set in prehistory
Windows games